7 Park Avenue is the first of four posthumous CD releases of demo material recorded by Badfinger's Pete Ham. The recordings are taken from various eras, beginning with compositions he wrote during his years with The Iveys from 1967 to 1969, and running throughout his tenure with Badfinger, ending with his death in 1975.
The majority of these recordings were made on The Iveys' Sound-On-Sound Revox mono tape machine. Many of the songs highlight Ham playing all the instruments. However, session musicians occasionally augment some of the tracks, most notably former Badfinger member Bob Jackson and former Iveys member, Ron Griffiths. All of the vocals and guitar licks are Ham's original performances.

A follow-up disc of Ham demo material, Golders Green, was released two years after this release.

7 Park Avenue was the address of Badfinger's band residence in Golders Green.  Golders Green is a suburb of London, England, probably most known for the Golders Green Crematorium which is the final resting place for many famous Britons including The Who drummer Keith Moon, famed psychoanalyst Sigmund Freud, and comedic actor Peter Sellers, star of the 1960s Pink Panther movies.

The following track listing represents the US and UK issues. The Japanese CD issue contains five bonus tracks here. In addition, the Japanese edition was remastered for its second pressing in 1999.

Track listing
All songs written by Pete Ham.

References

External links
7 Park Avenue page compiled by Tom Brennan
Pete Ham's Official website
Badfinger Biography Book

1997 albums
Demo albums
Pete Ham albums